The Environmental Management System (EMS) of NASA was developed under the standards of the ISO 14001. In creating the EMS it was necessary to provide maximum flexibility to each centers of NASA while living up to the standards of the ISO 14001, along with the "Executive Order 13148". The system was designed to benefit by "increased involvement of management and shop level personnel; reduced mission delays; improved procedures; reduction in single point failures; identification of pollution prevention opportunities; improved compliance; and better relationships with regulators and the public".

History
The EMS was tested at the Glenn Research Center in Cleveland, Ohio, Johnson Space Center in Houston, Texas, and Stennis Space Center in Bay St. Louis, Mississippi. The test study was carried out to evaluate the challenges of the system, including costs, resource requirements, and benefits. 

NASA's EMS development team has received the Circle Award from the White House for "creating an agency wide environmental management system".

Current role
NASA's EMS is a major contributor to the knowledge of Earth; EMS has used satellites and pictures from space to show and display the change over years, and the Goddard Space Flight Center to constantly monitor the changing atmosphere and ecosystem. EMS continues to research the damage black soot has on the earth's climate. Recent findings show that the black carbon or soot is indeed causing harm to the North pole, for example the rapid melting of sea ice, and snow changing the temperature of the atmosphere.

Dorothy Koch of Columbia University, writing in the Journal of Geophysical Research, mentioned that the research "offers additional evidence black carbon, generated through the process of incomplete combustion, MAY may have a significant warming impact on the Arctic", adding that this meant "there may be immediate consequences for Arctic ecosystems, and potentially long-term implications on climate patterns for much of the globe". NASA hopes to soon be able to use satellites in the measuring of public health, in order to investigate how weather, climate, and other environmental factors correlate with the occurrence of chronic and infectious diseases".

References

NASA groups, organizations, and centers